HMS Shropshire was a Royal Navy (RN) heavy cruiser of the London sub-class of s. She is the only warship to have been named after Shropshire, England. Completed in 1929, Shropshire served with the RN until 1942, when she was transferred to the Royal Australian Navy (RAN) following the loss of sister ship . Commissioned as HMAS Shropshire, the ship remained in RAN service until 1949, and was sold for scrap in 1954.

Design
Shropshire was one of four heavy cruisers built to the London design of the s.

The propulsion system consisted of eight Yarrow-type boilers, which fed Parsons geared turbines. These generated 80,000 shaft horsepower, which was fed to the ship's four  diameter propellers. At economical speed, she could travel .

Armament
The cruiser's initial armament consisted of eight BL 8 inch Mk VIII naval guns in four twin turrets, four single QF 4 inch Mk V naval guns and four single QF 2 pounder naval guns (or pom-poms) for anti-aircraft defence, four 3-pounder guns, and a number of smaller calibre guns for point defence. During the 1930s, two 0.5-inch machine guns were added to the point defence armament.

Shortly before transfer to the RAN in 1943, Shropshire underwent a refit. Although the main armament was unchanged, the 4-inch guns were upgraded to twin mountings, while the anti-aircraft armament was replaced with eighteen 20 mm Oerlikon guns (seven twin mountings and four single mountings) and two QF 2-pounder Mark VI eight-barrelled pom-poms. The 3-pounder guns were deleted, while two quadruple-tube launchers for 21-inch torpedoes and several depth charge chutes were installed. During the same refit, the cruiser ceased operating its seaplane, and the aircraft catapult was removed.

In 1945, during a refit in Sydney, Shropshires armament changed again. The torpedo tubes and depth charge throwers were stripped from the ship, and the entire Oerlikon outfit was replaced by fifteen single 40 mm Bofors guns. By February 1946, six of the Bofors guns had been removed, with the cruiser's armament settling into its final configuration.

Construction
Construction of the cruiser was ordered on 17 March 1926. Shropshire was laid down at the shipyard of William Beardmore and Company, at Dalmuir, Scotland on 24 February 1927. She was launched by Violet Herbert, Countess of Powis, on 5 July 1928. Completed on 12 September 1929, the cruiser was commissioned into the RN on 24 September 1929.

The ship's name was chosen by First Lord of the Admiralty William Bridgeman, whose constituency was located in the county of Shropshire. Shropshire is the only ship of the RN or RAN to carry the name. The ship's badge takes the leopard's face from the arms of the Shropshire County Council.

Operational history

RN service
After post-commissioning workups, Shropshire was assigned to the 1st Cruiser Squadron of the British Mediterranean Fleet in November 1929. During 1935 and 1936, the cruiser was involved in the British response to the Abyssinia Crisis. Shropshire was also present for the Spanish Civil War, and between 22 August and 16 September 1936, supported the evacuation of refugees from Barcelona. She remained in the Mediterranean (apart from returning to the United Kingdom for refits) until the outbreak of World War II in September 1939, at which point the cruiser was reassigned to the South Atlantic for trade protection patrols.

On 9 December 1939, Shropshire intercepted the German merchant Adolf Leonhardt, which was scuttled by her own crew. The cruiser returned to Britain for a refit in early 1940, before proceeding to the Indian Ocean, where she was employed on convoy cover duties between Cape Town-Durban-Mombassa and Aden. She also participated in the campaign against Italian Somaliland during 1941, bombarding both Mogadishu and Kismayu during the advance of the South African Army from Kenya to Abyssinia, and sinking the Italian vessel Pensilvania off Mogadishu on 13 February. She remained in the South Atlantic, undergoing a refit at Simon's Town between March and June 1941, then came home in October 1941 for a further major refit at Chatham between October 1941 and March 1942 before returning to the South Atlantic until the end of the year, when she was recalled to Chatham prior to transfer to the RAN.

The cruiser earned the RN battle honours "Atlantic 1941" and "Arctic 1941" for her wartime service.

Transfer to RAN
Following the loss of the Australian heavy cruiser , a County-class cruiser of the Kent sub-class, at the Battle of Savo Island, it was announced that Shropshire would be transferred to the RAN as a gift. King George VI announced on 10 September 1943 that the ship would be renamed Canberra.

The duplication of ship names with the United States Navy was against RAN policy, and it was initially felt that Australia had a greater claim to the name. Protests in favour of retaining Shropshires original name were received from the British elements of the ship's company, who felt that renaming a ship after one that had recently been sunk was inviting bad luck, and from citizens of the ship's namesake, which had adopted the cruiser in a Warship Week earlier that year, and thought that Shropshires history and links to the community were being discarded without thought. One letter proposed, that the ship be named "HMAS Canberra (the gift of HMS) Shropshire" in order to retain the old name. The Australian government decided to retain Shropshires old name after learning that the US offer had come directly from President Roosevelt.

Shropshire underwent refit at Chatham from December 1942 until 20 June 1943. Sources differ on the date of commissioning: although the commissioning ceremony was performed on 20 April, Captain John Augustine Collins successfully argued to have the ship recognised administratively as a commissioned Australian warship from 17 April, in order to keep Australian personnel (arriving that day) away from the RN rum issue. The refit was not completed until 25 June.

RAN service
Shropshire left the United Kingdom in August, as part of the escort for a convoy to Gibraltar. After this, she continued on to Australia, and arrived in Sydney on 2 October. At the end of the month, she joined Task Force 74 at Brisbane, and supported the amphibious landings at Arawe and Cape Gloucester during December. In March 1944, Shropshire was involved in the Admiralty Islands campaign. During April, the cruiser participated in the landing at Hollandia. Although the bomb missed both ships and appeared to cause no damage, the cruiser's engines began to malfunction four days later, and Shropshire returned to Australia for repairs.

The ship returned to service on 12 July, and provided naval gunfire support for operations in Aitape and Cape Sansapore during July and August, Morotai in September, and Leyte Gulf in early October. Shropshire was reassigned to Task Force 77, and participated in the Battle of Surigao Strait on 25 October. The cruiser was involved in the Battle of Luzon during January 1945, during which she was attacked by two kamikaze aircraft: one narrowly missed, while the second was shot down by  close enough for debris to hit Shropshire. Shropshire fired in anger for the last time during the Corregidor landings, then briefly returned to Australia.

Shropshire returned to the Philippines in time for the Japanese surrender of the islands, then proceeded to Japan, and was present at Tokyo Bay on 2 September 1945 for the signing of the Japanese Instrument of Surrender. The cruiser's wartime service with the RAN was recognised with five battle honours: "New Guinea 1943–44", "Leyte Gulf 1944", Lingayen Gulf 1945", "Borneo 1945", and "Pacific 1945". Only five personnel died during the ship's RAN service, but although all five occurred during World War II, none were the result of enemy action; one drowned, and the other four were the result of accidents.

The cruiser remained in Japanese waters until 17 November, when she sailed for Sydney. In May 1946, Shropshire transported the Australian contingent to England for the British Empire victory celebrations. The ship returned home in August. From January until March 1947, Shropshire was in Japanese waters.

Decommissioning and fate
After returning to Sydney in March 1947, Shropshire was prepared for decommissioning, although she was not paid off into reserve until 10 November 1949. The ship was sold to Thos. W. Ward of Sheffield, England, acting on behalf of the British Iron & Steel Corporation, on 16 July 1954, for 82,500 pounds sterling. On 9 October 1954, the Dutch tug Oostzee began the voyage from Sydney to Dalmuir, Scotland. Breaking commenced in Dalmuir on 20 January 1955, with the ship's hull then transported to Troon, where scrapping resumed on 19 September.

A silver bugle presented to the ship by the King's Shropshire Light Infantry was kept by the RAN after Shropshires decommissioning, and was later placed on display at the Russell Offices (which houses the Department of Defence) until at least the mid-1980s.

Citations

References

External links

RAN Sea Power Centre page for HMAS Shropshire
History of the ship as written by Stan Nicholls, who served aboard as a sailor
HMS Shropshire at U-boat.net
HMAS Shropshire at U-boat.net

London-class cruisers
County-class cruisers of the Royal Navy
Ships built on the River Clyde
1928 ships
World War II cruisers of the United Kingdom
World War II cruisers of Australia